Bilino Polje is the home football stadium of Bosnian Premier League football club NK Čelik from the city of Zenica in Bosnia and Herzegovina and one of two stadiums of the national football team of Bosnia and Herzegovina. It is also sometimes used for the Bosnia and Herzegovina national rugby union team as well.

History
The stadium was built and opened in 1972. It was used in Bosnia and Herzegovina's first match, a friendly played against Albania in 1996 with the final result being a 2–0 win to Albania. The stadium was once considered a "curse" for foreign national teams, because the Bosnian national team usually wins or rarely loses their home games at Bilino Polje stadium. In a period stretching from 1995 to October 2006, Bosnia went undefeated at home in around 15 games played in Zenica. The city of Zenica had to wait another 4 years (1996–2000) before the next match of the national team was played at the stadium. This match was also a friendly, this time against Macedonia, with the final result being a victory for the home side 1–0.

NK Čelik was formed in 1945 as a club and played its home games at Blatuša. At the time, the stadium was mainly built with wooden stands and could have an attendance of 15,600 spectators. Zenica, being an industrial city and having Željezara as the main provider for most of the population of the city, needed to provide some kind of job offer for its hard workers. Now, the decision was made to build a larger stadium since NK Čelik was taking part in the Yugoslav First League.

Bilino Polje was built within a 6 and 8 months period, and was ready for NK Čelik to host European teams in the then Mitropa Cup. At that time, NK Čelik hosted Fiorentina at the stadium in the finals of the Mitropa Cup and won it that year.
Also, NK Čelik went on to win the Mitropa Cup the following year as well. A few years after the construction, the stadium was actually given the award for being the most beautiful stadium in Yugoslavia. Bilino Polje has a rectangular shape with British style dimensions, rather than an oval shape such as the Stadium Koševo in Sarajevo, making it a somewhat unusual stadium in Bosnia-Herzegovina.

Location

The stadium is located in the Bilino Polje, urban area of Zenica, and can be easily accessed and navigated to from several points in the city. It is also well connected to the ongoing urban redevelopment of the city's road network.

Stadium statistics
ref1.
Football matches by the Yugoslavia national football team to 1992:

Football matches by the Bosnia and Herzegovina national football team to date:

Table correct as of 19 November 2015.

Image gallery

References

Architecture in Bosnia and Herzegovina
Football venues in Bosnia and Herzegovina
Football venues in Yugoslavia
Buildings and structures in the Federation of Bosnia and Herzegovina
Sport in Zenica
NK Čelik Zenica
Sports venues completed in 1972
1972 establishments in Bosnia and Herzegovina